Joseph Arthur Chell (20 June 1911 – 1 January 1992) was an English footballer who played as a centre-forward for Port Vale, Stoke City, Crewe Alexandra, Witton Albion and Stafford Rangers.

Career
Chell joined Second Division side Port Vale in November 1930 and made his debut on 14 February 1931 in a 2–1 defeat by Swansea Town at Vetch Field. Seven days later he got his first goal in a 2–1 win over Reading at The Old Recreation Ground, but also cut an artery in his leg and was out of action for the rest of the 1930–31 season. Once he recovered he failed to make the first team in the 1931–32 campaign and was instead given a free transfer to local rivals Stoke City in May 1932. He later played for Crewe Alexandra, Witton Albion and Stafford Rangers.

Career statistics
Source:

References

Footballers from Stoke-on-Trent
English footballers
Association football forwards
Port Vale F.C. players
Stoke City F.C. players
Crewe Alexandra F.C. players
Witton Albion F.C. players
Stafford Rangers F.C. players
English Football League players
1911 births
1992 deaths